The St Andrews Burghs by-election was a Parliamentary by-election held on 17 September 1903. The constituency returned one Member of Parliament (MP) to the House of Commons of the United Kingdom, elected by the first past the post voting system.

Vacancy
Henry Torrens Anstruther had been Liberal Unionist MP for the seat of St Andrews Burghs since the 1886 general election. He resigned on taking up the position of a Director of the Suez Canal.

Electoral history
The seat had been Liberal Unionist since they gained it in 1886. They easily held the seat at the last election, with an increased majority;

Candidates
The local Liberal Unionist Association selected 44-year-old Major William Anstruther-Thomson as their candidate to defend the seat. He served in South Africa from 1901-1902 where he was commandant of the district of Knysna in 1901, and Inspector of Concentration Camps in Transvaal in 1902.

The local Liberal Association selected 45-year-old Captain Edward Charles Ellice as their candidate to gain the seat. He was cousin and heir of Edward Ellice, a previous MP for the constituency.

Campaign
Polling Day was fixed for the 17 September 1903, just days after the previous MP.

Ellice, the Liberal candidate, declared himself against Home Rule for Ireland and also declined to support the disestablishment of the church in Scotland, both Liberal policies. This made his campaign less distinguishable from the Liberal Unionists. However, the candidates did differ on the question of trade, Ellice supported the Liberal position of support for Free trade while Thomson supported Tariff Reform as being advocated by leading Unionist Joseph Chamberlain.

Result
The Liberals gained the seat from the Liberal Unionists;

Aftermath
Anstruther-Thomson changed his name in 1904 to Anstruther-Gray. At the following general election, he re-gained the seat, the result was;

References

St Andrews Burghs by-election
St Andrews Burghs by-election
1900s elections in Scotland
20th century in Fife
St Andrews Burghs by-election
By-elections to the Parliament of the United Kingdom in Scottish constituencies
Politics of Fife